Athletico Sports Club, known as Athletico Beirut or simply Athletico, is a football academy based in Dbayeh, Lebanon.

History
Founded in 2006, the academy has eight branches across the country. Since 2011, Athletico has been partnered with French club Olympique Lyonnais. In particular, Lyon provide the academy with training expertise and facilities. Athletico graduate Philippe Paoli moved to Lyon's B team in 2013. In 2019, Athletico became the first football academy in the Middle East to receive the "One-Star" label from the Asian Football Confederation (AFC). In 2021, the AFC approved Athletico as an elite one-star academy after meeting the 20 criteria in the AFC's Elite Youth Scheme.

The women's team was founded in 2010 as one of the first in Lebanon. They were league runners up in the 2009–10 season, and cup finalists in 2010–11. They withdrew their team prior to the 2012–13 season.

The men's senior team won the Lebanese Fourth Division Beirut in 2021–22, and were promoted to the Third Division.

Honours

Men 
 Lebanese Fourth Division Beirut
 Champions (1): 2021–22

Women 
 Lebanese Women's FA Cup
 Runners-up (1): 2010–11

See also 
 Lebanese Women's Football League
 Women's football in Lebanon
 List of women's association football clubs in Lebanon

References

External links 
 Athletico SC at Kooora

 
Sports organisations of Lebanon
Youth sport in Lebanon
2006 establishments in Lebanon
Defunct football clubs in Lebanon
Women's football clubs in Lebanon
Association football clubs established in 2010
Association football clubs disestablished in 2013